Agents Of Anarchy is a compilation album from the Sex Pistols. it was released in August 2008.

Track listing

Disc one
"Submission" – 4:31
"Did You No Wrong" – 3:24
"Whatcha Gonna Do About It" – 4:25
"Feedback" – 1:35
"New York" – 3:56
"Substitute" – 3:22
"Liar" – 3:27
"No Lip" – 3:23
"Anarchy in the U.K." (Dave Goodman's Disco Mix) – 3:51
"The Last Interview" – 23:39

Disc two
"Pretty Vacant" – 3:00
"No Feelings" – 2:53
"I Wanna Be Me" – 3:12
"I'm a Lazy Sod" – 2:09
"Submission" – 4:16
"C'mon Everybody" – 1:56
"Search & Destroy" – 3:05
"Anarchy in the U.K." – 4:09
"Satellite" – 4:07
"No Lip" – 3:18
"God Save the Queen" – 3:42
"My Way" – 2:56
"Bill Grundy Interview" – 1:35

Personnel 

 Johnny Rotten – lead vocals
 Steve Jones – guitar, bass
 Paul Cook – drums
 Glen Matlock – bass
 Sid Vicious – bass, vocals

Sex Pistols compilation albums
2008 compilation albums